The Centre for Innovation, Research and Competence in the Learning Economy (CIRCLE) is
an interdisciplinary research centre situated in Lund, Sweden. It is spanning several faculties at Lund University and
Blekinge Institute of Technology. The activities cover the field of innovation, entrepreneurship, knowledge creation and economic growth.

History 

CIRCLE was initiated in July 2004 with long-term funding by VINNOVA (Swedish Governmental Agency for Innovation Systems), Lund University and Blekinge Institute of Technology. It is one of the four national research Centres of Excellence funded by VINNOVA. It has established connections with renowned research environments in the fields of innovation, entrepreneurship and economic growth. Guest researchers and visiting scholars are regularly invited to enhance the exciting international research and teaching milieu through presentations and seminars.

Research 

CIRCLE’s research is organized into the four main research areas addressing different aspects of innovation and knowledge creation. They are:
learning in innovation systems and the consequences of R&D and innovation for productivity growth
international comparison of regional innovation systems
the entrepreneurial university and the creation of research-based firms
public policy in the field of innovation, R&D and competence building in a comparative perspective.

The research focus lies on the socioeconomic and policy aspects of three kinds of learning: 
Innovation (in new products as well as processes) which takes place mainly in firms.
Research and Development (R&D) which is carried out in universities and research organizations as well as in firms.
Competence Building (e.g., training and education), which is done in schools and universities (schooling, education) as well as in firms (in the form of training, learning-by-doing, learning-by-using and individual learning, often throughout life). Competence building is the same as enhancement of human capital.

References 

Innovation organizations
Research institutes in Sweden
Scientific organizations based in Sweden
Lund University
2004 establishments in Sweden
Research and development in Sweden